Shan-e-Punjab is the domestic field hockey team for the Punjab in Pakistan. It is part of the Pakistan Hockey Federation.

Field Hockey is the national sport of Pakistan.

References 

Pakistani field hockey clubs